Plocama is a genus of flowering plants in the family Rubiaceae. It was described by William Aiton in 1789. It is distributed from the Canary Islands to northwestern India.

The genus was expanded in 2007 when several other Rubiaceae genera were merged into it. There are now about 34 species.

Plants of this genus are herbs or shrubs. They generally have an offensive scent when crushed. The leaves are oppositely arranged. The corolla is funnel shaped with a short to long tubular base. The fruit is either a drupe or a body that splits into two parts when ripe.

Species
Plants of the World Online includes:

 Plocama afghanica (Ehrend.) M.Backlund & Thulin
 Plocama asperuliformis (Lincz.) M.Backlund & Thulin
 Plocama aucheri (Guill.) M.Backlund & Thulin
 Plocama botschantzevii (Lincz.) M.Backlund & Thulin
 Plocama brevifolia (Coss. & Durieu ex Pomel) M.Backlund & Thulin
 Plocama bruguieri (A.Rich. ex DC.) M.Backlund & Thulin
 Plocama bucharica (B.Fedtsch. & Des.-Shost.) M.Backlund & Thulin
 Plocama calabrica (L.f.) M.Backlund & Thulin
 Plocama calcicola (Puff) M.Backlund & Thulin
 Plocama calycoptera (Decne.) M.Backlund & Thulin
 Plocama corcyllis (Sond.) M.Backlund & Thulin
 Plocama crucianelloides (Jaub. & Spach) M.Backlund & Thulin
 Plocama dubia (Aitch. & Hemsl.) M.Backlund & Thulin
 Plocama eriantha (Jaub. & Spach) M.Backlund & Thulin
 Plocama hymenostephana (Jaub. & Spach) M.Backlund & Thulin
 Plocama iljinii (Lincz.) M.Backlund & Thulin
 Plocama inopinata (Lincz.) M.Backlund & Thulin
 Plocama jolana (Thulin) M.Backlund & Thulin
 Plocama kandaharensis (Ehrend. & Qarar ex (Ehrend. & Schönb.-Tem.) M.Backlund & Thulin
 Plocama macrantha (Blatt. & Hallb.) M.Backlund & Thulin
 Plocama mestscherjakovii (Lincz.) M.Backlund & Thulin
 Plocama olivieri (A.Rich. ex DC.) M.Backlund & Thulin
 Plocama pendula Aiton
 Plocama puberula (Balf.f.) M.Backlund & Thulin
 Plocama putorioides (Radcl.-Sm.) M.Backlund & Thulin
 Plocama reboudiana (Coss. & Durieu) M.Backlund & Thulin
 Plocama rosea (Hemsl. ex Aitch.) M.Backlund & Thulin
 Plocama somaliensis (Puff) M.Backlund & Thulin
 Plocama szowitzii (DC.) M.Backlund & Thulin
 Plocama thymoides (Balf.f.) M.Backlund & Thulin
 Plocama tinctoria (Balf.f.) M.Backlund & Thulin
 Plocama trichophylla (Popov) M.Backlund & Thulin
 Plocama vassilczenkoi (Lincz.) M.Backlund & Thulin
 Plocama yemenensis (Thulin) M.Backlund & Thulin

References

External links
World Checklist of Rubiaceae

 
Rubiaceae genera